Winchester Dana Osgood (April 12, 1870 – October 18, 1896) was a prominent American college athlete in the late 19th century at both Cornell University and University of Pennsylvania.  He played halfback on the football teams at both schools and served as the head football coach at Indiana University for one season in 1895, compiling a record of 4–3–1.  Osgood volunteered for the Cuban forces during Cuba’s fight for Independence from Spain.  He was commissioned a major in artillery in the Cuban Army and was killed in combat.  Osgood was inducted into the College Football Hall of Fame as a player in 1970.

Early life
Born in Fort Barrancas, Florida, Osgood was one of five children of an American army officer Henry Brown Osgood Jr. and his wife, Harriet Mary (Hubbard) Osgood.  Henry Osgood eventfully rose to the rank of brigadier general.

College athlete
Osgood, nicknamed "Win", was one of the greatest college athletes of the 19th century.  He was talented in many sports but is best known for his exploits as an All-American football player.  Osgood stood 5–9, weighed 173, and was an elusive runner. Pudge Heffelfinger, the legendary All-American from Yale University, gave this description of Osgood: "It was downright uncanny to watch him run, opponents missed him by inches. His body undulated like a snake's. He was the Red Grange of the pioneer era."

Cornell
At Cornell, Osgood received a medal as the school's best all-around athlete. He ran the 440 and put the shot for the track team, was an accomplished gymnast, boxer, wrestler, tennis player, and set a collegiate record of 5:28 for the 2-mile bicycle race.  Osgood played halfback for four years for the Cornell football team, 1888–1889 and 1891–1992, during which time Cornell went 28–8. Osgood was a considered one of the top players in the early years of Big Red football.   In an article on January 29, 1927, The Sun named him to the first team of the all-time Cornell football team.   Osgood also rowed on the varsity in 1890. In 1892, he was the single scull championship of the Cornell. He left Cornell in the fall of 1892 to attend the University of Pennsylvania.

Pennsylvania
At Pennsylvania, Osgood continued his exploits as a three-sport athlete, excelling at football, track and field, and wrestling.  He lettered two seasons at halfback for the Quakers under Hall of Fame coach George Washington Woodruff.  In his first year, he helped the 1893 Quakers to a 12–3 record.  The team had a strong start, winning its first 11 games.  During that stretch, the defense only gave up 18 points while the offense scored 305 points.  But Penn lost three out of the last four games to perennial powers Harvard, Yale and Princeton. At the time Penn rarely beat the "Big Three", as they were known.   Osgood received widespread press in the 14–6 loss to Yale, as he scored Penn’s only touchdown in the game. Yale had not been scored upon on for 35 straight games dating back to 1890, having amassed 1,355 unanswered points. In 1894, Osgood helped Penn to its first undefeated season.  The 1894 squad featured one of the greatest backfields of all time, consisting of Carl Sheldon Williams at quarterback, George Brooke at fullback, and Osgood and Alden Knipe at halfback. Osgood, Knipe and Brooke were all named to Walter Camp's All-American first team that year. The team was widely recognized as 1894's football national champion.   The highlight of the season was a 12–0 victory over Princeton, only Penn's second win in 30 meetings with the Tigers, and an 18–4 victory over Harvard.

First college wrestling national champion
Osgood also excelled at wrestling.  He became the first collegiate athlete to win a national championship when he won the 1895 National AAU title in the "heavyweight" class (for competitors over 158 pounds).  At the time the sport was dominated by club teams.

Indianapolis light Artillery

After a brief stint as an assistant coach for the University of Indiana's football team, Osgood joined the Indianapolis Light Artillery as both player and coach somewhere after their October 24th contest together.  he would lead them to a record of 5-2, with an impressive win 18-0 over an undefeated Notre Dame and a 28-0 blank of Butler University on Thanksgiving.

Cuba’s fight for independence
When Cuba began its fight for independence from Spain, Osgood volunteered for the Cuban forces. He was commissioned a major in the artillery under General Calixto Garcia. Early in October 1896, the Cuban General Garcia  and General Maximo Gomez joined forces and moved upon Guimaro, which was strongly fortified and defended by the Spaniards. After much hard fighting and a brilliant charge led by  Colonel Mario García Menocal, the largest fortification was taken. During the battle, Major Osgood was in charge of shelling several blockhouses with a Hotchkiss rifle using 12-pound shells.   Osgood's artillery unit was under steady fire from small arms. When Osgood stooped over the gun to adjust the sight to account for the wind, he made the remark, “think that will do.”   At that moment, he was hit by a bullet fired by a sharp-shooter stationed in the church tower eleven hundred yards away. Osgood was carried from the location by his comrades and hurried down the hill to the aid station.  Without re-sighting the artillery piece, Osgood’s second in command Major Frederick Funston gave the order to fire the gun and the shell hit one of the blockhouses.  The bullet that hit Osgood had gone through his brain and he did not recover from his wounds.

Head coaching record

References

External links
 

1870 births
1896 deaths
19th-century players of American football
American football halfbacks
Cornell Big Red football players
Cornell Big Red wrestlers
Indiana Hoosiers football coaches
Penn Quakers football players
Penn Quakers wrestlers
College Football Hall of Fame inductees
Cuban soldiers
People from Escambia County, Florida
Deaths by firearm in Cuba
Military personnel killed in action